In mathematics, a braided vectorspace  is a vector space together with an additional structure map  symbolizing interchanging of two vector tensor copies:

such that the Yang–Baxter equation is fulfilled. Hence drawing tensor diagrams with  an overcrossing the corresponding composed morphism is unchanged when a Reidemeister move is applied to the tensor diagram and thus they present a representation of the braid group.
 
As first example, every vector space is braided via the trivial braiding (simply flipping). A superspace has a braiding with negative sign in braiding two odd vectors. More generally, a diagonal braiding means that for a -base  we have

If  additionally possesses an algebra structure inside the braided category ("braided algebra") one has a braided commutator (e.g. for a superspace the anticommutator): 

Examples of such braided algebras (and even Hopf algebras) are the Nichols algebras, that are by definition generated by a given braided vectorspace. They appear as quantum Borel part of quantum groups and often (e.g. when finite or over an abelian group) possess an arithmetic root system, multiple Dynkin diagrams and a PBW-basis made up of braided commutators just like the ones in semisimple Lie algebras.

Hopf algebras
Quantum groups